Barricada (from Spanish: Barricade) were a Navarrese hard rock band created in 1982 in the Txantrea neighbourhood of Pamplona/Iruñea.

The band members were Enrique Villareal (El Drogas) as bassist and vocalist, Javier Hernandez (Boni) guitarist and vocalist, Alfredo Piedrafita as guitarist and Ibon Sagarra (Ibi) on drums. Together they have written over 100 songs and sold over a million discs.

On January 8, 2021, Boni died at age 58 of laryngeal cancer.

Discography

References

External links
Official website

Spanish heavy metal musical groups
Musical quartets
Rock en Español music groups